Pervis Ellison (born April 3, 1967) is an American former National Basketball Association (NBA) player. Nicknamed "Never Nervous Pervis" for his clutch play with the University of Louisville, after leading Louisville to a national championship, Ellison was the first overall pick in the 1989 NBA Draft. His professional career was largely hindered by injuries, though he won the NBA Most Improved Player Award in 1992.

Collegiate career
In his freshman year he led Louisville to its second national championship, scoring a game-leading 25 points and adding 11 rebounds in the 72-69 championship win over Duke, and was then named the Most Outstanding Player—the second time a freshman had ever been awarded that honor, after Arnie Ferrin in 1944 for Utah.

Professional career
Ellison was made the first overall pick in the 1989 NBA draft by the Sacramento Kings. Teammate Danny Ainge gave Ellison the nickname "Out of Service Pervis" for the many injuries that would plague him during his professional career. An injury kept him on the sidelines for 48 of 82 games of his rookie year, after which he was traded to the Washington Bullets in a three-team trade involving the Utah Jazz that also sent Jeff Malone to the Jazz and Eric Leckner, Bob Hansen, and draft picks to the Kings. On April 6, 1991, Ellison scored a career-best 30 points while adding 12 rebounds in a win over the Indiana Pacers. Although he sometimes played as a backup in 1990–1991, the following year he became a full time starter and earned Most Improved Player honors after averaging 20.0 points, 11.4 rebounds and 2.68 blocks per game. Among the best games of Ellison's NBA career occurred on January 31, 1992, when he recorded 19 points, 19 rebounds, 6 assists, 5 blocked shots and 2 steals against the Knicks.

Assorted injuries plagued his career, including two knee problems that kept him benched for 29 games in 1992–93 and 30 games in 1993–94. Ellison signed with the Boston Celtics after he was released by Washington in April 1994, but did not play until midway through the following season because he was still rehabilitating from knee problems. A broken toe suffered while moving furniture kept him out of most games between 1996 and 1998. After participating in 69 out of a possible 246 games over the final three seasons with the Celtics, he joined the Seattle SuperSonics in 2000 but retired after playing nine games. He once coached basketball for Life Center Academy in Burlington, New Jersey and is a resident of Voorhees Township, New Jersey. His son Malik played for him at Life Center Academy and is a professional basketball player.

Career statistics

NBA

Regular season

|-
| style="text-align:left;"|
| style="text-align:left;"|Sacramento
| 34 || 22 || 25.5 || .442 || .000 || .628 || 5.8 || 1.9 || .5 || 1.7 || 8.0
|-
| style="text-align:left;"|
| style="text-align:left;"|Washington
| 76 || 30 || 25.6 || .513 || .000 || .650 || 7.7 || 1.3 || .6 || 2.1 || 10.4
|-
| style="text-align:left;"|
| style="text-align:left;"|Washington
| 66 || 64 || 38.0 || .539 || .333 || .782 || 11.2 || 2.9 || .9 || 2.7 || 20.0
|-
| style="text-align:left;"|
| style="text-align:left;"|Washington
| 49 || 48 || 34.7 || .521 || .000 || .702 || 8.8 || 2.4 || .9 || 2.2 || 17.4
|-
| style="text-align:left;"|
| style="text-align:left;"|Washington
| 47 || 24 || 25.1 || .469 || .000 || .722 || 5.1 || 1.5 || .5 || 1.1 || 7.3
|-
| style="text-align:left;"|
| style="text-align:left;"|Boston
| 55 || 11 || 19.7 || .507 || .000 || .717 || 5.6 || .6 || .4 || 1.0 || 6.8
|-
| style="text-align:left;"|
| style="text-align:left;"|Boston
| 69 || 29 || 20.7 || .492 ||  || .641 || 6.5 || .9 || .6 || 1.4 || 5.3
|-
| style="text-align:left;"|
| style="text-align:left;"|Boston
| 6 || 4 || 20.8 || .375 ||  || .600 || 4.3 || .7 || .8 || 1.5 || 2.5
|-
| style="text-align:left;"|
| style="text-align:left;"|Boston
| 33 || 8 || 13.5 || .571 ||  || .588 || 3.3 || .9 || .6 || .9 || 3.0
|-
| style="text-align:left;"|
| style="text-align:left;"|Boston
| 30 || 5 || 9.0 || .442 ||  || .714 || 2.2 || .4 || .3 || .3 || 1.8
|-
| style="text-align:left;"|
|style="text-align:left;"|Seattle
| 9 || 0 || 4.4 || .286 ||  || 1.000 || 1.3 || .3 || .0 || .2 || .7
|- class="sortbottom"
| style="text-align:center;" colspan="2"|Career
| 474 || 245 || 24.5 || .520 || .050 || .689 || 6.7 || 1.5 || .6 || 1.6 || 9.5

Playoffs

|-
| style="text-align:left;"|1995
| style="text-align:left;"|Boston
| 4 || 0 || 17.0 || .579 ||  || 1.000 || 4.3 || .5 || .5 || 1.3 || 6.0
|- class="sortbottom"
| style="text-align:center;" colspan="2"|Career
| 4 || 0 || 17.0 || .579 ||  || 1.000 || 4.3 || .5 || .5 || 1.3 || 6.0

See also
 List of NCAA Division I men's basketball players with 2000 points and 1000 rebounds

References

External links

1967 births
Living people
20th-century African-American sportspeople
21st-century African-American people
African-American basketball players
All-American college men's basketball players
American men's basketball players
Basketball players at the 1987 Pan American Games
Basketball players from Savannah, Georgia
Boston Celtics players
Centers (basketball)
Louisville Cardinals men's basketball players
McDonald's High School All-Americans
Medalists at the 1987 Pan American Games
Pan American Games medalists in basketball
Pan American Games silver medalists for the United States
People from Voorhees Township, New Jersey
Sacramento Kings draft picks
Sacramento Kings players
Seattle SuperSonics players
Washington Bullets players
United States men's national basketball team players